R-7 Expressway can refer to:
R7 expressway (Czech Republic)
R-7 Expressway (Philippines)
R7 expressway (Slovakia)